Aughrim or Eachroim (literally "horse ridge" in Irish) is the name of a number of villages in Ireland:

 Aughrim, County Galway, a village in County Galway, scene of the Battle of Aughrim
 Aughrim, County Wicklow, a village in County Wicklow, Republic of Ireland
 Aughrim, County Cavan, a townland in County Cavan, Republic of Ireland
 Aughrim, County Down, a townland in County Down, Northern Ireland
 Aughrim, County Fermanagh, a townland in County Fermanagh, Northern Ireland
 Aughrim, County Londonderry, a townland in County Londonderry, Northern Ireland
 Aughrim, County Roscommon, a civil parish in County Roscommon, Republic of Ireland

Other uses 
Aughrim Park, Gaelic Athletic Association stadium in Aughrim, County Wicklow
Aughrim Rugby, rugby football club based in Aughrim, County Wicklow
Baron Aghrim, a title created twice in the Peerage of Ireland
Battle of Aughrim, decisive battle of the Williamite War in 1691
River Aughrim in County Wicklow
Aughrim Ringforts, archaeological sites